Gournia is the site of a Minoan palace complex on the island of Crete, Greece, excavated in the early 20th century by the American archaeologist, Harriet Boyd-Hawes. The original name for the site is unknown. The modern name comes from the abundant hollow vessels found all over the site. Gournia lies in the municipality of Ierapetra in the prefecture of Lasithi.

Chronology 
The overarching term "Bronze Age" means something different depending on the culture and region of the world being studied. The Aegean Bronze Age is defined according to the place, which are mainland, Aegean islands, and Crete. These are referred to as Helladic, Cycladic, and Minoan respectively. Although Crete is an island in the Aegean, their culture is so distinctive from the ones considered to be Cycladic that it stands on its own.

Archaeologists abbreviate the chronological periods using two prefixes. The first one always refers to the major Bronze Age period which are Early, Middle and Late. The second letter stands for the place: H for Helladic, M for Minoan and C for Cycladic. Lastly, some of these periods are further divided and distinguished from each other by adding Roman numerals and sometimes letters for subperiods. Thus, EM IIB refers to the last half of the second period of the Early Minoan Bronze Age. Besides using this notation, since the Bronze Age in Crete is based on the building, use, and destruction of important architectural structures known as "palaces" found throughout the island, Minoan archaeologists tend to employ and use these as criteria to name the periods as Pre-palatial, Protopalatial, Neopalatial and Post-palatial.

History 
Harriet Boyd Hawes excavated the Minoan village for three field seasons in 1901, 1903 and 1904. Boyd and her team were able to expose almost the entire town, uncovering sixty houses, a central building which she called "the palace", the cemetery and a road system connecting all these features.

Gournia and other Minoan sites were settled along the north coast where seasonal storms, particularly in the winter, bring the salt inland making the land unsuitable for crops. Nonetheless, the location of the settlement is strategic due to being at the island’s narrowest point, connecting not only the east to the west but the north with the south. This makes Gournia the main trading center of the island in Minoan times.

There is evidence that the Minoans traded with the Egyptians as evident by the Cretan artifacts found in Egyptian sites and the opposite is also true. Moreover, the influence of this relationship can be seen in art, where the Minoans borrowed techniques and imagery from Egyptian art.

Cemetery at Sphoungaras and North Cemetery 

Sphoungaras is located 150 to 200 meters from the Gournia ridge, looking over the coast. Its natural rock shelters, openings in the rock, provided the Minoans for a suitable space to bury their dead without the need for physical labor to create or build tombs. The cemetery was in continuous use from EM II to the end of LM I. Inhumation was the preferred mode of body disposal from early Bronze Age until the pithos burial, where the bodies were placed inside a large storage container. This method was introduced and became the norm around 1900-1800 BC. These burials were first excavated by Harriet Boyd and later revisited by Richard Seager in 1910  and Soles and Davaras in 1970.  Some of the artifacts found were various types of complete vases, jewelry, and seals made out of ivory.

The North cemetery is located along a steep and rocky ridge about 80 meters from Gournia. First discovered by Boyd and her team in 1901, she discovered what she described as “intramural burials,” later coining the term “house tombs” to refer to them. Unlike the cemetery in Sphoungaras, people were buried in built structures here. The remains were deposited in no particular order in a charnel house manner.

Tomb I 

The house tomb is a square building measuring approximately 4 meters on all its sides. It is located on the east slope of the North cemetery. First excavated by Boyd, in 1971 it was revisited by a different team of archaeologists, yielding numerous artifacts presumed to be funerary offerings. Among the findings were two small vases, a miniature jug, a mug with no handles from MM Ia found in situ; as well as a silver kantharos, two bird's nest bowls, a pair of bronze tweezers, stone vases, seals, jewelry and fragmentary sarcophagi with remains of 8 skulls and other unidentified bones.

Tomb II 

Together with Tomb I, the second house tomb are the best preserved funerary structures in Gournia. Unlike Tomb I, this house tomb is rectangular and consists of two rooms; it is the only tomb that has an altar. Altars are commonly found outside of tholoi, round structures where the dead were commonly deposited, in other sites from the South of Crete. Nonetheless, both Tomb I and II would have appeared like normal houses to outsiders without the presence of the shrine due to the use of the same construction techniques and architectural style applied to build the town's structures.

Some of the artifacts found in this house tomb were stone seals, fruitstands, three bronze tweezers, terracotta vases, cups, jugs, pithoi, and larnakes. Among these were fragmentary bones with only one salvageable skull. The accumulation and pattern of deposition of the human remains suggest that these were moved to the side once fully skeletonized to make space for more bodies. This was a common practice among the ancient Greeks and is still practiced today in many other cultures.

See also 
 List of ancient Greek cities

References

Bibliography
 Watrous, L.V. (2012). “The Harbor Complex at Gournia,” American Journal of Archaeology Vol. 116 (2012), pp. 521–542.
 Watrous, L.V., D.M. Buell, J.C. McEnroe, J.G. Younger, L.A. Turner, B.S. Kunkel, K. Glowacki, S. Gallimore, A. Smith, P.A. Pantou, A. Chapin, and E. Margaritis. 2015. "Excavations at Gournia, 2010-2012," Hesperia Vol. 84 (2015), pp. 397–465.
 Watrous, L.V.  D. Haggis, K. Nowicki, N. Vogeikoff-Brogan, and M. Schultz. (2012). An Archaeological Survey of the Gournia Landscape: A Regional History of the Mirabello Bay, Crete, in Antiquity (Prehistory Monographs 37). Philadelphia, PA: INSTAP Academic Press. .
 Watrous, L.V., and A. Heimroth. (2011). “Household Industries of Late Minoan IB Gournia and the Socioeconomic Status of the Town,” in ΣΤΕΓΑ: The Archaeology of Houses and Households in Ancient Crete (Hesperia Suppl. 44), edited by K. Glowacki and N. Vogeikoff-Brogan, pp. 199–212. Princeton: American School of Classical Studies at Athens. .

External links
Gournia Excavation Project
Minoan Crete website page for Gournia
Minoan Crete website page for Gournia North cemetery
Minoan Crete website page for Gournia Minoan harbour installations
Gournia Crete

Minoan sites in Crete
Ierapetra
Aegean palaces of the Bronze Age
Populated places in ancient Crete